Journey Jay Brown (born March 19, 1999) is a former American football running back. He played college football for the Penn State Nittany Lions.

Early years
Brown attended Meadville Area Senior High School in Meadville, Pennsylvania. During his career, he rushed for 7,027 yards and 106 touchdowns. During a game his junior year in 2015, he broke Pennsylvania high school records for rushing yards in a game with 722 and rushing touchdowns with 10. He committed to Penn State University to play college football. Brown also ran track in high school and broke the Pennsylvania record for 100 meter dash which was held by Olympian Leroy Burrell.

College career
After redshirting his first year at Penn State in 2017, Brown played in eight games in 2018 and had 44 yards on eight carries with a touchdown. As a redshirt sophomore in 2019, he started 10 of 13 games, rushing for 890 yards on 129 carries and 12 touchdowns. He was named the MVP of the 2019 Cotton Bowl after rushing for a school bowl game record 202 yards. On November 11, 2020, PSU Head Coach James Franklin announced Brown could no longer play football due to hypertrophic cardiomyopathy.

References

External links
Penn State Nittany Lions bio

1999 births
Living people
People from Meadville, Pennsylvania
Players of American football from Pennsylvania
American football running backs
Penn State Nittany Lions football players